Nasirabad Government High School (NGHS) is a government-run high school in Bangladesh. It is managed by a committee and is situated in the East Nasirabad area in Chittagong - a port city and the country's second largest city. It's an all-boys school with approximately 3000 students. Educational activities are conducted across two shifts.

The school was ranked No. 3 in Chittagong in 2019 and 2020,

History

NGHS was founded in 1967 by the government of Pakistan. After the liberation war of Bangladesh it came under the control of the government of Bangladesh.

Campus
The school campus covers 20 acres and includes a library, auditorium, prayer room and individual laboratories for physics, chemistry, biology, computer science and other subjects. The two-story academic building is K-shaped. The campus houses a single-story extension building inside the boundary named "New Academic Building". The office of the Education Officer of Chittagong is situated inside the campus in a 2-storied building. This office building contains the hostels for the students of this school. This school has a large field in front of the Education Officer's office. Many famous cricket, football, and hockey players started their careers on this field. Tamim Iqbal, the former vice-captain of Bangladesh cricket team, played his first cricket match there. He made his first six here and has since called it his 'favourite' of his career.

Transport
A school bus provides the main transport for the students. The bus is used to transport students living in remote areas during the day & morning shift.

Extra-curricular activities
This school is renowned for the quality of its education, and for extra-curricular activities. It won the national championship of cricket, football, and hockey on several occasions. Many inter-city and inter-school cricket and football tournaments are held there. Several world-recognized players of the Bangladesh cricket team such as Aftab Ahmed, and Akram Khan are alumni of NGHS.

The school takes students for tours. The Bangladesh National Cadet Corps (BNCC), Rover Scout, Red Crescent operate at this school.

Curriculum
The syllabus of every class taught is designed by teachers according to the rules of Chittagong Education Board. The language of instruction is Bengali. The students of class 9, 10 and SSC are required to participate in laboratory work, as well as in theoretical classes. The three-semester exam is taken each year. These are 1st, 2nd and final semesters. If a student fails in the final exam he is not promoted. The students of class five, eight and ten participate in the Primary Ending Exam, Junior School Certificate Exam & Secondary School Certificate Exam.

Admission
In January the school takes students in classes five, six and nine. The intake is class 5–140, Class 6-140 and Class 9-60. Students have to qualify in a competitive admission test to be admitted. NGHS only 17% of the applicants who take this test matriculate.

Teachers are appointed directly by the Government of Bangladesh through an Associate Teacher Recruitment Examination taken throughout the country.

Activities and achievements
 The school ranked 3rd in [[Chittagong board  according to the result of SSC exam in 2019 to 2021.

Notable alumni
 Akram Khan: Former Player, Captain, of Bangladesh cricket team & the chief selector of the BCB.
 Partha Barua: Singer, Band Member of Souls band.
 Aftab Ahmed: Represented Bangladesh Cricket team in World Cup, member of the touring cricket team to New Zealand in 2010.

See also
 List of schools in Bangladesh

References

External links

 
 

Boys' schools in Bangladesh
Educational institutions established in 1967
1967 establishments in East Pakistan
Public schools in Chittagong